Basford is a tram station on Nottingham Express Transit (NET), in the city of Nottingham suburb of Basford. The tram lines here run parallel to the Robin Hood railway line that links Nottingham with Worksop, but there is no corresponding railway station. Both tram and railway lines have two tracks, and the resulting four tracks are crossed by a pedestrian bridge. The tram stop comprises a pair of side platforms on both sides of the tramway.

The tram stop is located on the site of the sidings and goods shed of the former Basford Vernon railway station, which opened in 1848 and closed in 1964. The tram stop opened on 9 March 2004, along with the rest of NET's initial system.

With the opening of NET's phase two, Basford is now on the common section of the NET, where line 1, between Hucknall and Chilwell, and line 2, between Phoenix Park and Clifton, operate together. Trams on each line run at frequencies that vary between 4 and 8 trams per hour, depending on the day and time of day, combining to provide up to 16 trams per hour on the common section.

Gallery

References

External links

Nottingham Express Transit stops
Railway stations in Great Britain opened in 2004